Maurice Henderson (4 April 1913 - 14 October 1989) was a Scotland international rugby union player.

Rugby Union career

Amateur career
He also played club rugby for Dunfermline.

He later played for Leicester Tigers.

Provincial career
He represented Midlands District in their match against North of Scotland District. Midlands won 8-3 on 6 November 1937.

Henderson then played for North of Scotland District combined side in their match against South of Scotland District on 20 November 1937.

He was then selected for the Scotland Probables side in the trial match against Scotland Possibles. The first trial on 18 December 1937 fell foul of the weather, but Henderson turned out for Probables on 15 January 1938. He didn't impress in the first half and turned out for the Possibles in the second half.

International career
Henderson was capped 3 times for Scotland in 1937.

Teaching career
Henderson became the Physical Education instructor at Dunfermline High School. He then moved to Bedford to become the Director of Physical Education for Bedfordshire county in England.

References

1913 births
1989 deaths
Dunfermline RFC players
Leicester Tigers players
Midlands District players
North of Scotland (combined side) players
Rugby union players from Musselburgh
Scotland international rugby union players
Scotland Possibles players
Scotland Probables players
Scottish rugby union players
Rugby union props